Leonardo Bondumier (1605–1668) was a Roman Catholic prelate who served as Archbishop of Split (1641–1668).

Biography
Leonardo Bondumier was born in Venice, Italy in 1605.
On 15 April 1641, he was appointed during the papacy of Pope Urban VIII as Archbishop of Split.
On 21 April 1641, he was consecrated bishop by Alessandro Cesarini (iuniore), Cardinal-Deacon of Sant'Eustachio. 
He served as Archbishop of Split until his death in 1668.

References

External links and additional sources
 (for Chronology of Bishops) 
 (for Chronology of Bishops) 

17th-century Roman Catholic bishops in Croatia
Bishops appointed by Pope Urban VIII
1605 births
1668 deaths